Transparent is an American comedy-drama streaming television series created by Joey Soloway for Amazon Studios that debuted on February 6, 2014. The story revolves around a Los Angeles family, the Pfeffermans, and their lives after learning that their parent (Jeffrey Tambor) is a trans woman named Maura. Transparent tells the story of Maura's coming out, as well as her family's personal journeys in discovering their own identities and coming to terms with Maura's identity. Transparent moves away from a solely transition-centred narrative and represents Maura's story in her role as a trans parent, grandparent, professor, partner, ex-spouse, sibling, and as an older person transitioning. Transparent also holds space for other queer representation in the Pfefferman family. Sarah (Amy Landecker) explores her sexuality and works through relationship dilemmas throughout season one while Ali (Gaby Hoffmann) explores their gender and sexuality. Transparents first season premiered in full on September 26, 2014, and its second season on December 11, 2015, third season on September 23, 2016, and fourth season on September 21, 2017.

Amazon picked up the series for a fourth season ahead of the premiere of the third. The fourth season premiered on September 22, 2017. Shortly before the premiere, Amazon renewed the series for a fifth and final season, which ultimately took the form of a feature-length finale with the subtitle Musicale Finale, which was released on September 27, 2019.

At the 72nd Golden Globe Awards, the show won the Golden Globe Award for Best Television Series – Musical or Comedy, while Jeffrey Tambor won the Golden Globe Award for Best Actor in a Television Series – Musical or Comedy and the Primetime Emmy Award for Outstanding Lead Actor in a Comedy Series. This is the first show produced by Amazon Studios to win a major award and the first show produced by a streaming media service to win a Golden Globe for Best Series.

The series began airing on Sundance TV starting August 9, 2017.

In November 2017, Tambor was accused of sexual harassment on the set. On November 19, 2017, Tambor stated, "I don't see how I can return to Transparent" after a second sexual harassment allegation was made against him. He was officially fired from Transparent a few months later, on February 15, 2018.

The show had faced earlier criticism regarding the initial casting of Tambor, a cisgender, heterosexual man, in the role of a trans woman.

The Transparent: Musicale Finale addressed the death of Tambor's character, Maura, and examined the lives of the Pfefferman family life through the lens of Maura's former spouse, Shelly (Judith Light), and through music. The Finale, featuring music and lyrics by Faith Soloway, was developed through a series of concerts at Joe's Pub and, in addition to the regular and recurring cast, featured performers Shakina Nayfack, Lesli Margherita, Erik Liberman, and Jo Lampert.

Cast

Overview

Main cast
 Jeffrey Tambor as Maura Pfefferman (Seasons 1–4), a retired college professor of political science at UCLA who finally opens up to her family about always identifying as a woman.
 Amy Landecker as Sarah Pfefferman, the oldest sibling. She is married and has two children. She leaves her husband for Tammy, a woman she fell in love with in college. She is initially the most accepting of Maura's transition. Kelsey Reinhardt portrays Sarah as a teenager.
 Jay Duplass as Josh Pfefferman, the middle sibling. A successful music producer who has troubled relationships with women. He seems to have a hard time accepting Maura's transition at first. Dalton Rich portrays Josh as a teenager.
 Gaby Hoffmann as Ali Pfefferman, the youngest sibling. She is perpetually unemployed and has a tendency to be immature for her age. Hoffmann also plays Maura's mother Rose in flashbacks. Emily Robinson portrays the younger version of both characters. In the series finale, Ali has come out as non-binary and changed their name to Ari.
 Judith Light as Shelly Pfefferman, Maura's ex-wife and the mother of Sarah, Josh, and Ali. She has been aware of Maura's desire to express her inner femininity for years.
 Kathryn Hahn as Rabbi Raquel Fein (recurring Seasons 1–2, main cast Season 3, Film), Josh's ex-fiancée and rabbi at the Pfeffermans' synagogue.

Recurring cast

 Melora Hardin as Tammy Cashman, Sarah's ex-flame
 Alexandra Billings as Davina, an educator at an LGBT center and Maura's best trans friend
 Trace Lysette as Shea, an educator at an LGBT center and one of Maura's friends
 Ray Abruzzo as Sal, Davina's boyfriend
 Carrie Brownstein as Syd Feldman, Ali's best friend with whom she begins a sexual relationship
 Kiersey Clemons as Bianca, Tammy's daughter from her first marriage
 Rob Huebel as Len Novak, Sarah's husband and father of Zack and Ella
 Zackary Arthur as Zack Novak, Sarah and Len's son
 Abby Ryder Fortson (Season 1), Julia Butters (Seasons 2–3), and Ashley Silverman (Season 4) as Ella Novak, Sarah and Len's daughter
 Lawrence Pressman as Ed Paskowitz, Shelly's second husband.
 Amin Joseph as Mike
 Noah Harpster as Francis
 Brett Paesel as Rita Holt, the Pfefferman kids' former babysitter and Josh's ex-flame
 Jenny O'Hara as Bryna, Maura's sister
 Alex MacNicoll as Colton, Josh and Rita's biological son
 Brett Rice as Pastor Gene, Colton's adoptive father
 Meagen Fay as Blossie, Colton's adoptive mother
 Cleo Anthony as Derek
 Deborah S. Craig as Kristin
 Sawyer Ever as Zack
 Bradley Whitford as Marcy (Season 1)/Magnus Hirschfeld (Season 2)
 Alison Sudol as Kaya, Josh's ex-girlfriend and ex-client
 Cherry Jones as Leslie Mackinaw, an academic with whom Ali wants to study
 Anjelica Huston as Vicki, a cisgender woman who forms a connection with Maura
 Hari Nef as Gittel (born Gershom), Maura's aunt who never made it out of Berlin
 Michael Stuhlbarg as Chaim, Maura's grandfather
 Michaela Watkins as Connie, the wife of a crossdresser (Season 1)/Yetta, Maura's grandmother (Seasons 2–3)
 Jason Mantzoukas as Dr. Steve, the Pfefferman kids' marijuana dispenser
 Tig Notaro as Barb, Tammy's second ex-wife
 Jiz Lee as Pony, a professional dominatrix
 Luzer Twersky as Mendel
 Alexandra Grey as Elizah Parks (Season 3)
 Richard Masur as Buzzy Rackless, a synagogue board member
 Kobi Libii as Duvid Ovadia, the cantor at the synagogue

Episodes

Background
Soloway felt inspired to create Transparent after their parent came out as trans. They created the pilot for Amazon.com, which became available for free streaming and download on February 6, 2014 as part of Amazon's second pilot season. Amazon Studios picked up the pilot for Transparent in March, 2014, ordering a ten-episode season.

Tambor had previously portrayed transvestite judge Alan Wachtel on the police procedural television show Hill Street Blues in the 1980s. Soloway wrote Hoffmann's role after seeing her performance on Season 3 of Louis C.K.'s show Louie.

Transparent premiered all ten episodes simultaneously in late September 2014. In Canada, where Amazon's video streaming service was not available, the series premiered on the Shomi platform on January 23, 2015.

Religious themes

The series depicts several Jewish characters and deals with spiritually and culturally Jewish themes. Joey Soloway, the series' primary creator, is Jewish and consulted Rabbi Susan Goldberg of Wilshire Boulevard Temple. They also sought advice from Rabbi Amichai Lau-Lavie of New York, describing him as "a God-optional patriarchy-toppling Jewish modern mind. There's a mandate among religious and spiritual thinkers to be thinking about the binary, the gendered, the feminist, the goddess, and Amichai reminds me of that every day."

Production 
Soloway said that they hoped to use the series to explore ideas of gender identity through a "wounded parent being replaced by a blossoming femininity" and that they pictured Tambor as Maura when writing the character.

Soloway, the writers, and the cast developed, workshopped, and rehearsed both seasons with consulting producer Joan Scheckel at Joan Scheckel Filmmaking Labs.

As part of the making of the show, Soloway enacted a "transfirmative action program", whereby trans applicants were hired in preference to cis ones. Over eighty trans people worked on the show, including Zackary Drucker and Rhys Ernst, trans consultants and co-producers. However, the main character Maura was played by the cis male actor Tambor. Soloway said the casting of a cis male in this type of role is unacceptable and they would not make the same casting decision again because of how trans women would feel about watching a cis male portrayal.

In 2014, Our Lady J was chosen as the first openly trans person to be a writer for the show. All the bathrooms on set were gender-neutral.

The original pilot made available in February 2014 (with Gillian Vigman in the role of Tammy) was partly reshot after the series was approved.

On November 19, 2017, Tambor quit the show amidst sexual harassment allegations made against him.

Reception

On Rotten Tomatoes it received an overall score of 91%, and an overall score of 85 on Metacritic.

Season 1
On Rotten Tomatoes, the first season held an approval rating of 98% based on 59 reviews, with an average rating of 8.8/10. The site's consensus read: "As much about a change in television as it is about personal change, Transparent raises the bar for programming with sophistication and sincere dedication to the human journey, warts and all." On Metacritic, the first season received an average rating of 92 out of 100, based on 29 critics, indicating "universal acclaim".

Alan Sepinwall from HitFix named Transparent the best new show of the Fall 2014 season and Amazon's "most impressive volley yet". He added:"... [The] show looks gorgeous and displays an instant command of both tone and this particular pocket of life in Los Angeles; Soloway is incredibly confident in introducing us to the parts of the show that are more universally relatable (a marriage gone sour, a disappointing child), knowing that we'll then follow her into more unfamiliar territory—not just with Maura, but the many disreputable behaviors her kids get tangled up in."

Season 2
The second season held a 98% approval rating on Rotten Tomatoes based on 42 reviews, with an average rating of 9.2/10. The site's critical consensus read: "Transparents second season ups its dramatic stakes while retaining the poignancy and humor that have made the series such a consistently entertaining example of the best that modern serial drama has to offer." On Metacritic, the second season received an average rating of 94 out of 100, based on 28 critics, indicating "universal acclaim".

Season 3
The third season held a 100% approval rating on Rotten Tomatoes based on 38 reviews, with an average rating of 8.4/10. The site's critical consensus read, "Uniquely its own, and compelling and poignant as ever, Transparent continues to transcend the parameters of comedic and dramatic television with sustained excellence in its empathetic portrayal of the Pfefferman family." while Metacritic granted the season an average rating of 90 of 100, based on 15 critics, indicating "universal acclaim".

Season 4
The fourth season held a 91% approval rating on Rotten Tomatoes based on 22 reviews, with an average rating of 7.9/10. The site's critical consensus read, "Transparent's fourth season forsakes tight narrative discipline for an absorbingly unwieldy continued exploration of the show's uniquely ambitious themes." while Metacritic granted the season an average rating of 74 of 100, based on 10 critics, indicating "generally favorable reviews".

Film
Transparent: Musicale Finale held a 68% approval rating on Rotten Tomatoes based on 25 reviews, with an average rating of 5.6/10. The site's critical consensus read, "Though it won't be for everyone, Transparent's singular musical finale grants its audience closure while giving its groundbreaking characters something they never expected: something resembling a happy ending" while Metacritic granted the finale an average rating of 55 of 100, based on 13 critics, indicating "mixed or average reviews".

International broadcast
In Australia, the first two episodes of the series premiered on the Nine Network on January 27, 2015, and all subsequent episodes premiered on streaming service Stan upon its launch.

As Prime Video was not available in Canada at the time, the series launched on the Shomi platform.

Awards

On December 11, 2014, the series was nominated for a Golden Globe Award in the category Best TV Comedy. On January 11, 2015, Transparent won two Golden Globe awards for the first season of the series. Tambor dedicated his win for Outstanding Lead Actor in a Comedy Series to the trans community, while Soloway dedicated their award to the memory of Leelah Alcorn.

See also

 Normal (2003)
 Becoming Us (2015)
 List of transgender characters in film and television

References

External links 

 
 
 Emmy Award
 Funk, S., Funk, J. Transgender Dispossession in Transparent: Coming Out as a Euphemism for Honesty. Sexuality & Culture 20, 879–905 (2016). https://doi-org.proxybl.lib.montana.edu:3443/10.1007/s12119-016-9363-0

2010s American comedy-drama television series
2010s American LGBT-related comedy television series
2010s American LGBT-related drama television series
2014 American television series debuts
2019 American television series endings
Amazon Prime Video original programming
Best Musical or Comedy Series Golden Globe winners
Bisexuality-related television series
Television series about Jews and Judaism
Lesbian-related television shows
LGBT culture in Los Angeles
Primetime Emmy Award-winning television series
Serial drama television series
Television series about dysfunctional families
Television series by Sony Pictures Television
Television series by Amazon Studios
Television shows filmed in Los Angeles
Transgender-related television shows
Nonlinear narrative television series
Television Academy Honors winners
Television shows set in Los Angeles